Teataja was an Estonian-language daily newspaper published in 1901–1905 in Tallinn (Reval), Estonia (then part of the former Russian Empire). 

The politically leftist ("social democratic") newspaper was founded in 1901 by Konstantin Päts and Eduard Vilde. Its editors included Mihkel Martna, Hans Pöögelmann, Mihkel Pung, Otto Münther, Johannes Voldemar Veski, and A. H. Tammsaare amongst others.

Newspapers published in Estonia
Mass media in Tallinn